Hungary national bandy team is competing for Hungary in the international bandy tournaments.

History 
Austria-Hungary national bandy team participated in the 1913 European Bandy Championships but it is uncertain if there were any Hungarian players.

Hungary national bandy team made its international debut in the Rossiya Tournament 1990 in Novosibirsk, Soviet Union.

Hungary made its world championship debut in 1991, but the team has so far not reached any medals. On 6 January 2014 Hungary came in second in a four nation tournament in Davos, a centenary celebration of the European Championship of 1913. The other teams were Netherlands, Czech Republic, and Germany.

Following the withdrawal by Canada, Hungary took its place in Division A at the 2018 WCS,  marking the first time Hungary will compete in the elite division, after Division B was created. However, Hungary came in last in the division, was relegated, and has played in Division B since, but has qualified for Division A in 2022.

Tournament participation

World Championships
1991 – 8th place
1993 – 7th place
1995 – 8th place
1997 – 8th place
2004 – 8th place (3rd in Group B)
2005 – 11th place (5th in Group B)
2006 – 9th place (3rd in Group B)
2007 – 10th place (4th in Group B)
2008 – 13th place (7th in Group B)
2009 – 13th place (7th in Group B)
2010 – 10th place (4th in Group B)
2011 – 10th place (4th in Group B)
2012 – 9th place (3rd in Group B)
2013 – 10th place (4th in Division B)
2014 – 11th place (3rd in Division B)
2015 – 10th place (3rd in Division B)
2016 – 10th place (2nd in Division B)
2017 – 10th place (2nd in Division B)
2018 – 8th place
2019 – 11th place (3rd in Division B)
2020 – 9th place (1st in Division B)

References

External links 
 Hungarian Bandy Federation Official Homepage (in Hungarian)

National bandy teams
Bandy
Bandy in Hungary